Category 2 is the second lowest classification on the Australian tropical cyclone intensity scale used to classify tropical cyclones, that have 10-minute sustained winds of .  tropical cyclones have peaked as Category 1 tropical cyclones in the South Pacific tropical cyclone basin, which is denoted as the waters surrounding Australia to the south of the equator, between 90°E and 160°E. The earliest tropical cyclone to be classified as a Category 2 tropical cyclone was Carmen. The latest was Harold which was classified as a Category 2 tropical cyclone as it moved through the Solomon Sea.

Background
The Australian region tropical cyclone basin is located to the south of the Equator between 90°E and 160°E. The basin is officially monitored by the Australian Bureau of Meteorology, Papua New Guinea's National Weather Service as well as Indonesia's Badan Meteorologi Klimatologi dan Geofisika. Other meteorological services such as the Fiji Meteorological Service, the New Zealand MetService, Météo-France as well as the United States Joint Typhoon Warning Center also monitor the basin. However, this scale is not officially used in the Australian, however, various agencies including NASA also use it to compare tropical cyclones. A Category 1 tropical cyclone is expected to cause some damage, if it significantly impacts land at or near its peak intensity.

Systems

1960/70s

|-
| Audrey ||  ||  ||  || Northern Territory, Queensland || Extensive || None ||
|-
| Dawn || 15–16 February 1970 ||  ||  || New Caledonia || || ||
|-
| Gertie || 13–15 February 1971 ||  ||  || Queensland || || ||
|-
| Ida || 17–18 February 1971 ||  ||  || New Caledonia || || ||
|-
| Lena || 14–18 March 1971 ||  ||  || New Caledonia || || ||
|-
| Carlotta
|-
| Wendy
|-
| Belinda
|-
| Ida || 30 May – 1 June 1972 ||  ||  || Solomon Islands, New Caledonia || || ||
|-
| Leila–Gertrude
|-
| Annie
|-
| Una
|-
| Erica
|-
| Fiona–Gwenda
|-
| Vera
|-
| Wanda ||  ||  ||  || Queensland, New South Wales || ||  ||
|-
| Yvonne ||  ||  ||  ||  ||  ||  ||
|-
| Jenny (1974)
|-
| Marcia (1974)
|-
| Norah (1974)
|-
| Penny (1974)
|-
| Gloria (1975)
|-
| Robyn-Deborah ||  ||  ||  || Madagascar || || ||
|-
| Shirley (1975)
|-
| Wilma (1975)
|-
| Vida (1975)
|-
| Clara (1975)
|-
| Alice (1976)
|-
| Dawn (1976)
|-
| Harry (1976)
|-
| Tom (1977)
|-
| Sam–Celimene (1977)
|-
| Gwen (1978)
|-
| Brenda (1978)
|-
| Hal (1978)
|-
| Greta (1979)
|-
| Ivan (1979)
|-
| Jane (1979)
|-
| Kevin ||  ||  ||  || None || None || None ||
|-
| Tony (1979)
|}

1980s

|-
| Clara (1980)
|-
| Ruth (1980)
|-
| 27P (1980)
|-
| Dan (1980)
|-
| Eddie (1981)
|-
| Cliff (1981)
|-
| Bruno (1982)
|-
| Daphne–Fifi (1982)
|-
| Errol (1982)
|-
| Graham (1982)
|-
| Harriet (1982)
|-
| Esther (1983)
|-
| Sharon (1983)
|-
| Tim (1984)
|-
| Harvey (1984)
|-
| Ferdinand (1984)
|-
| Lance ||  ||  ||  || Queensland || N/A ||  ||
|-
| Monica (1984)
|-
| Nigel ||  ||  ||  || Queensland ||  ||  ||
|-
| Pierre ||  ||  ||  || Queensland || Minimal ||  ||
|-
| Tanya ||  ||  ||  || Cape York Peninsula || Minimal ||  ||
|-
| Gretel ||  ||  ||  || Northern Territory || || ||
|-
| Pancho (1986)
|-
| Selwyn (1986)
|-
| Tiffany (1986)
|-
| Alison–Krisostoma (1986)
|-
| Irma (1987)
|-
| Damien (1987)
|-
| Jason ||  ||  ||  || Northern Territory || N/A ||  ||
|-
| Kay (1987)
|-
| Agi ||  ||  ||  || Papua New Guinea, New Caledonia || N/A ||  ||
|-
| Barisaona (1988)
|-
| Charlie ||  ||  ||  || Queensland || ||  ||
|-
| Delilah ||  ||  ||  || New Caledonia, New Zealand || N/A ||  ||
|-
| Meena (1989)
|-
| Pedro (1989)
|}

1990's

|-
| Tina ||  ||  ||  || Western Australia ||  ||  ||
|-
| Nancy ||  ||  ||  || Queensland, New South Wales, New Zealand ||  ||  ||
|-
| Walter –Gregoara ||  ||  ||  || None ||  ||  ||
|-
| Hilda ||  ||  ||  || New Caledonia ||  ||  ||
|-
| Chris ||  ||  ||  || Western Australia ||  ||  ||
|-
| Daphne ||  ||  ||  || Northern Australia ||  ||  ||
|-
| Kelvin ||  ||  ||  || Queensland ||  ||  ||
|-
| Elma ||  ||  ||  || Queensland ||  ||  ||
|-
| Fifi ||  ||  ||  || Western Australia ||  ||  ||
|-
| Lisa ||  ||  ||  || Papua New Guinea, Solomon Islands, Vanuatu ||  ||  ||
|-
| Mark ||  ||  ||  || Queensland, Northern Territory ||  ||  ||
|-
| Lena ||  ||  ||  || None ||  ||  ||
|-
| Roger ||  ||  ||  || Solomon Islands, New Caledonia ||  ||  ||
|-
| Monty ||  ||  ||  || None ||  ||  ||
|-
| Willy ||  ||  ||  || Cocos Islands ||  ||  ||
|-
| Ethel ||  ||  ||  || Queensland, Northern Territory ||  ||  ||
|-
| Jenna ||  ||  ||  || None ||  ||  ||
|-
| Ophelia ||  ||  ||  || None ||  ||  ||
|-
| Fergus ||  ||  ||  || Solomon Islands, VanuatuNew Caledonia, New Zealand ||  ||  ||
|-
| Phil ||  ||  ||  || Northern Australia, Western Australia ||  ||  ||
|-
| 18S ||  ||  ||  || None ||  ||  ||
|-
| Harold ||  ||  ||  || New Caledonia ||  ||  ||
|-
| Nute ||  ||  ||  || None ||  ||  ||
|-
| Les ||  ||  ||  || Northern Australia ||  ||  ||
|-
| Nathan ||  ||  ||  || Queensland ||  ||  ||
|-
| Cathy ||  ||  ||  || None ||  ||  ||
|-
| Pete ||  ||  ||  || New Caledonia ||  ||  ||
|-
| Hamish ||  ||  ||  || None ||  ||  ||
|-
| Ilsa ||  ||  ||  || Christmas Island, Western Australia ||  ||  ||
|}

2000's

|-
| Steve ||  ||  ||  || Northern Australia, Western Australia ||  ||  ||
|-
| Olga ||  ||  ||  || None ||  ||  ||
|-
| Hudah ||  ||  ||  || Madagascar, Mozambique ||  ||  ||
|-
| Vaughan ||  ||  ||  || Queensland ||  ||  ||
|-
| Terri ||  ||  ||  || Western Australia ||  ||  ||
|-
| Vincent ||  ||  ||  || Western Australia ||  ||  ||
|-
| Alistair ||  ||  ||  || Northern Territory, Western Australia ||  ||  ||
|-
| Alex – Andre ||  ||  ||  || None ||  ||  ||
|-
| Bessi – Bako ||  ||  ||  || None ||  ||  ||
|-
| Bernie ||  ||  ||  || Northern Territory ||  ||  ||
|-
| Des ||  ||  ||  || Eastern Australia, New Caledonia ||  ||  ||
|-
| Bonnie ||  ||  ||  || Timor, Indonesia ||  ||  ||
|-
| Unnamed ||  ||  ||  || Northern Territory, Western Australia ||  ||  ||
|-
| Craig ||  ||  ||  || Queensland, Northern Territory ||  ||  ||
|-
| Linda ||  ||  ||  || None ||  ||  ||
|-
| Fritz ||  ||  ||  || Northern Australia ||  ||  ||
|-
| Nicky - Helma ||  ||  ||  || None ||  ||  ||
|-
| Grace ||  ||  ||  || None ||  ||  ||
|-
| Sally ||  ||  ||  || None ||  ||  ||
|-
| Daryl ||  ||  ||  || Western Australia ||  ||  ||
|-
| Kate ||  ||  ||  || Torres Strait ||  ||  ||
|-
| Hubert ||  ||  ||  || Western Australia ||  ||  ||
|-
| Nelson ||  ||  ||  || Northern Territory, Queensland ||  ||  ||
|-
| Lee - Ariel ||  ||  ||  || None ||  ||  ||
|-
| Melanie ||  ||  ||  || Western Australia ||  ||  ||
|-
| Helen ||  ||  ||  || Northern Australia ||  ||  ||
|-
| Ophelia ||  ||  ||  || Northern Territory, Western Australia ||  ||  ||
|-
| Rosie ||  ||  ||  || Christmas Island ||  ||  ||
|-
| Durga ||  ||  ||  || None ||  ||  ||
|-
| Anika ||  ||  ||   || None ||  ||  ||
|-
| Dominic ||  ||  ||   || Western Australia ||  ||  ||
|-
| Jasper ||  ||  ||  || New Caledonia ||  ||  ||
|}

2010's

|-
| Olga ||  ||  ||  || Solomon Islands, Queensland, Northern Territory ||  ||  ||
|-
| Robyn ||  ||  ||  || None ||  ||  ||
|-
| Sean ||  ||  ||  || None ||  ||  ||
|-
| Abele ||  ||  ||  || None ||  ||  ||
|-
| Anthony ||  ||  ||  || Queensland ||  ||  ||
|-
| Grant ||  ||  ||  || Northern Territory, Queensland ||  ||  ||}}</ref>
|-
| Iggy ||  ||  ||  || Western Australia ||  ||  ||
|-
| Jasmine ||  ||  ||  || Queensland, New Caledonia, Vanuatu, Tonga ||  ||  ||
|-
| Koji–Joni ||  ||  ||  || None ||  ||  ||
|-
| Tim ||  ||  ||  || Cape York Peninsula ||  ||  ||
|-
| Dylan ||  ||  ||  || Queensland ||  ||  ||
|-
| 09U ||  ||  ||  || Northern Territory, Western Australia ||  ||  ||
|-
| Bakung ||  ||  ||  || None ||  ||  ||
|-
| Stan ||  ||  ||  || Western Australia & Southern Australia ||  ||  ||
|-
| Uriah ||  ||  ||  || Cocos Islands ||  ||  ||
|-
| Tatiana ||  ||  ||  || Queensland ||  ||  ||
|-
| Alfred ||  ||  ||  || Queensland, Northern Territory ||  ||  ||
|-
| Blanche ||  ||  ||  || Western Australia, Northern Territory ||  ||  ||
|-
| 22U ||  ||  ||  || Western Australia ||  ||  ||
|-
| Dahlia ||  ||  ||  || Indonesia, Christmas Island ||  ||  ||
|-
| Hilda ||  ||  ||  || Western Australia ||  ||  ||
|-
| Iris ||  ||  ||  || Solomon Islands, Queensland ||  ||  ||
|-
| Penny ||  ||  ||  || Queensland ||  ||  ||
|-
| Oma ||  ||  ||  || Cape York ||  ||  ||
|-
| Wallace ||  ||  ||  || None ||  ||  ||
|-
| Ann ||  ||  ||  || Solomon Islands, Northern Australia ||  ||  ||
|}

2020's

|-
| Imogen ||  ||  ||  || Northern Territory, Queensland ||  ||  ||
|-
| Lucas ||  ||  ||  || Queensland, New Caledonia ||  ||  ||
|-
| Ruby ||  ||  ||  || New Caledonia ||  ||  ||
|-
| Seth ||  ||  ||  || Northern Territory, Eastern Australia ||  ||  ||
|-
| Tiffany ||  ||  ||  || Northern Australia ||  ||  ||
|-
| Anika ||  ||  ||  || Western Australia ||  ||  ||
|-
| Billy ||  ||  ||  || None ||  ||  ||
|-
| Karim ||  ||  ||  || None ||  ||  ||
|}

Other systems

Climatology

Notes

See also
List of Category 2 Atlantic hurricanes
List of Category 2 Pacific hurricanes

References

External links

Australian